Vulcaniella cognatella is a moth of the family Cosmopterigidae. It is found from Ukraine to Sardinia and Greece.

The wingspan is 7–9 mm. Adults are on wing from June to July.

The larvae feed on Salvia officinalis. They mine the leaves of their host plant. The larva probably lives in a silken tube under a leaf from which it mines the leaf.

External links
bladmineerders.nl

Vulcaniella
Moths of Europe
Moths of Asia
Moths described in 1991